This is a list of poets who wrote or write much of their poetry in the Indonesian language.

 Ahmadun Yosi Herfanda (1958) 
 Afrizal Malna (1957)
 Agus R. Sarjono (1962)
 Ajip Rossidhy (1938)
 Amir Hamzah (1911–1946)
 Asrul Sani (1926)
 Chairil Anwar (1922-1949)
 Cecep Syamsul Hari (1967)
 Djamil Suherman (1924–85)
 Eka Budianta (1956)
 Goenawan Mohammad (1942)
 Gola Gong (1963)
 HB Jassin (1917-2000)
 Iman Budhi Santosa (1948)
 J.E. Tatengkeng (1907-1968)
 Linus Suryadi AG (1951-99)
 Muhammad Yamin (1903–1962)
 Remy Sylado (1945)
 Sanusi Pané (1905–1968)
 Sapardi Djoko Damono (1940)
 Sitor Situmorang (1924)
 Subagio Sastrowardoyo (1924)
 Sutan Takdir Alisjahbana (1908–86)
 Sutardji Calzoum Bachri (1940)
 Taufik Ismail (1937)
 Toeti Heraty (1942)
 Toto Sudarto Bachtiar (1929–2007)
 Udo Z. Karzi (1970)
 Usmar Ismail (1921-1971)
 Utuy Tatang Sontani (1920-1979)
 Widji Thukul (1963)
 W.S. Rendra (1935–2009)

References
 

 
Forum Penyair Internasional Indonesia, Whatispoetry.net 

Indonesian